Albert-László Barabási (born March 30, 1967) is a Romanian-born Hungarian-American physicist, best known for his discoveries in network science and network medicine.

He is Distinguished University Professor and Robert Gray Professor of Network Science at Northeastern University, and holds appointments at the Department of Medicine, Harvard Medical School and the Department of Network and Data Science at Central European University. He is the former Emil T. Hofmann Professor of Physics at the University of Notre Dame and former associate member of the Center of Cancer Systems Biology (CCSB) at the Dana–Farber Cancer Institute, Harvard University.

He discovered in 1999 the concept of scale-free networks and proposed the Barabási–Albert model to explain their widespread emergence in natural, technological and social systems, from the cellular telephone to the World Wide Web or online communities. He is the Founding President of the Network Science Society, which sponsors the flagship NetSci conference held yearly since 2006.

Birth and education
Barabási was born to an ethnic Hungarian family in Cârța, Harghita County, Romania. His father, László Barabási, was a historian, museum director and writer, while his mother, Katalin Keresztes, taught literature, and later became director of a children's theater. He attended a high school specializing in science and mathematics; in the tenth grade, he won a local physics olympiad. Between 1986 and 1989, he studied physics and engineering at the University of Bucharest; during that time, he began doing research on chaos theory, publishing three papers.

In 1989, Barabási emigrated to Hungary, together with his father. In 1991, he received a master's degree at Eötvös Loránd University in Budapest, under Tamás Vicsek, before enrolling in the Physics program at Boston University, where he earned a PhD in 1994. His thesis, written under the direction of H. Eugene Stanley, was published by Cambridge University Press under the title Fractal Concepts in Surface Growth.

Academic career

After a one-year postdoc at the IBM Thomas J. Watson Research Center, Barabási joined the faculty at the University of Notre Dame in 1995. In 2000, at the age of 32, he was named the Emil T. Hofman Professor of Physics, becoming the youngest endowed professor. In 2004 he founded the Center for Complex Network Research.

In 2005–06 he was a Visiting Professor at Harvard University. In Fall, 2007, Barabási left Notre Dame to become the Distinguished Professor and Director of the Center for Network Science at Northeastern University and to take up an appointment in the Department of Medicine at Harvard Medical School.

As of 2008, Barabási holds Hungarian, Romanian and U.S. citizenship.

Research and achievements
Barabási has been a major contributor to the development of network science, the statistical physics of complex systems and network medicine.

Scale-Free Networks 
His biggest role has been the discovery of the scale-free networks. He reported the scale-free nature of the WWW in 1999 and the same year, in a Science paper with Réka Albert, he proposed the Barabási–Albert model, predicting that growth and preferential attachment are jointly responsible for the emergence of the scale-free property in real networks. According to the review of one of Barabási's books, preferential attachment can be described as follows:"Barabási has found that the websites that form the network (of the WWW) have certain mathematical properties. The conditions for these properties to occur are threefold. The first is that the network has to be expanding, growing. This precondition of growth is very important as the idea of emergence comes with it. It is constantly evolving and adapting. That condition exists markedly with the world wide web. The second is the condition of preferential attachment, that is, nodes (websites) will wish to link themselves to hubs (websites) with the most connections. The third condition is what is termed competitive fitness which in network terms means its rate of attraction."

He subsequently showed that the scale-free property emerges in biological systems, namely in metabolic networks and protein–protein interaction networks. Science celebrated the ten-year anniversary of Barabási’s 1999 discovery by devoting a special issue to Complex Systems and Networks in 2009.

Network Robustness 
In a 2001 paper with Réka Albert and Hawoong Jeong he demonstrated the Achilles' heel property of scale-free networks, showing that such networks are robust to random failures but fragile to attacks. Specifically, they showed that networks can easily survive the random failure of a very large number of nodes. At the same time, networks collapse under attack, achieved by removing the biggest hubs. The threshold characterizing the breakdown of a network under random failures was linked  it to the second moment of the degree distribution, finding that the threshold converges to zero for large networks, indicating that networks can survive the failure of a large fraction of their nodes. The calculations also showed that robustness to random failures is not limited to scale-free networks, but it is a general property of most real networks with a wide range of node degrees.

Network Medicine 
Barabási is one of the founders of network medicine, a term he coined in a scientific article entitled "Network Medicine – From Obesity to the "Diseasome", published in The New England Journal of Medicine, in 2007. His work introduced the concept of diseasome, or disease network, showing how diseases are connected through shared genes, capturing their common genetic roots.  He subsequently pioneered the use of large patient data, linking the roots of disease comorbidity to molecular networks.  A key concept of network medicine is his discovery that genes  associated with the same disease are located in the same network neighborhood.  This discovery lead to the concept of disease module, currently used to aid drug discovery, drug design, and the development of biomarkers, as he outlined in 2012 in a TEDMED talk. Barabási's work inspired the founding of the Channing Division of Network Medicine at Harvard Medical School and the Network Medicine Institute and Global Alliance, representing 33  universities and institutions around the world committed to advancing the field. Barabási's work in network medicine has led to multiple experimentally falsifiable predictions, helping identify experimentally validated novel pathways in asthma, predicting novel mechanism of action for rosmarinic acid, and  novel therapeutic functions of existing drugs (drug repurposing). The products of network medicine are in the clinic, helping doctors decide if rheumatoid arthritis patients respond to anti-TNF therapy. During COVID  Barabási led a major collaboration involving researchers from Harvard University, Boston University and The Broad Institute, to predict and experimentally test the efficacy for COVID patients of 6,000 approved drugs.

Human Dynamics 
Barabási's work on human dynamics resulted in the discovery of the fat tailed nature of the inter event times in human activity patterns. The pattern showed that human activity is bursty - short periods of intensive activity are followed by long periods that lack detectable activity.  He proposed the Barabási model of human dynamics, demonstrating that a queuing model can explain the bursty nature of human activity, a topic is covered by his book Bursts.

Network Control 
His work on network controllability and observability brought the tools of control theory to network science. Barabási asked how to identify the nodes through which one can control a complex network, just like a car is controlled through three control points, the steering wheel, gas pedal and the brake. He developed the analytical formalism of network controllability by mapping the control problem, widely studied in physics and engineering since Maxwell, into graph matching, a graph theoretic problem, merging statistical mechanics and control theory.  The exact mapping allowed him to develop tools to identify the system's control nodes. He used network control to predict the function of  individual neurons in the Caenorhabditis elegans connectome, leading to the discovery of new neurons involved in the control of locomotion, and  offering direct falsifiable experimental confirmation of network control principles.

Awards
Barabási was the recipient of the 2023 Julius Edgar Lilienfeld Prize, one of the top prizes of the American Physical Society, "for pioneering work on the statistical physics of networks that transformed the study of complex systems, and for lasting contributions in communicating the significance of this rapidly developing field to a broad range of audiences."

In 2021 Barabási received the EPS Statistical and Nonlinear Physics Prize, for "his pioneering contributions to the development of complex network science, in particular for his seminal work on scale-free networks, the preferential attachment model, error and attack tolerance in complex networks, controllability of complex networks, the physics of social ties, communities, and human mobility patterns, genetic, metabolic, and biochemical networks, as well as applications in network biology and network medicine."

In 2021 Barabási was ranked 2nd in the world in the field of Engineering and Technology.

In 2019 he received The Bolyai Prize from the Hungarian Academy of Sciences.

In 2017 he received the Senior scientific award of the Complex Systems Society for  "setting the basis of what is now modern Network Science".

In 2011 he received the Lagrange Prize-Crt Foundation Prize. 

In 2008 he received the 2008 C&C Prize, Japan "for stimulating innovative research on networks and discovering that the scale-free property is a common feature of various real-world complex networks" and the Cozzarelli Prize, National Academies of Sciences (USA)

In 2006 he was awarded the John von Neumann Medal by the John von Neumann Computer Society from Hungary, for outstanding achievements in computer-related science and technology.

In 2005, he was awarded the FEBS Anniversary Prize for Systems Biology. 

He was elected  Fellow of the American Physical Society in 2003, fellow of AAAS in 2011, Fellow of the Network Science Society in 2021.

In 2004, he was elected as an external member of the Hungarian Academy of Sciences, in 2007, he was inducted into the Academia Europaea,   in 2013 he was elected as fellow of the Massachusetts Academy of Sciences,  in 2018 he was elected into the European Academy of Arts and Sciences, and in 2018 was elected member of the Romanian Academy of Sciences. 

In 2011 he was awarded Honorary degree Doctor Honoris Causa by Technical University of Madrid,  in 2018 received an honorary doctorate from Utrecht University and from the University of West Timisoara.

Selected publications
 Barabási, Albert-László, The Formula: The Universal Laws of Success, November 6, 2018;  (hardcover)

 Barabási, Albert-László, Bursts: The Hidden Pattern Behind Everything We Do, April 29, 2010;  (hardcover)
 Barabási, Albert-László, Linked: The New Science of Networks, 2002.  (pbk)
 Barabási, Albert-László and Réka Albert, "Emergence of scaling in random networks", Science, 286:509–512, October 15, 1999
 Barabási, Albert-László and Zoltán Oltvai, "Network Biology", Nature Reviews Genetics 5, 101–113 (2004)
 Barabási, Albert-László, Mark Newman and Duncan J. Watts, The Structure and Dynamics of Networks, 2006; 
 Barabási, Albert-László, Natali Gulbahce, and Joseph Loscalzo, "Network Medicine", Nature Reviews Genetics 12, 56–68 (2011)
 
Y.-Y. Liu, J.-J. Slotine, A.-L. Barabási, "Controllability of complex networks", Nature 473, 167–173 (2011)
Y.-Y. Liu, J.-J. Slotine, A.-L. Barabási, "Observability of complex systems", Proceedings of the National Academy of Sciences 110, 1–6 (2013)
Baruch Barzel and A.-L. Barabási, "Universality in Network Dynamics", Nature Physics 9, 673–681 (2013)
Baruch Barzel and A.-L. Barabási, "Network link prediction by global silencing of indirect correlations", Nature Biotechnology 31, 720–725 (2013)
B. Barzel Y.-Y. Liu and A.-L. Barabási, "Constructing minimal models for complex system dynamics", Nature Communications 6, 7186 (2015)

References

External links
Albert-László Barabási professional website
Research Publications
Profile, Center for Complex Network Research 
Profile, Northeastern University website
Profile , Center for Cancer Systems Biology (CCSB) website
Profile, University of Notre Dame website

1967 births
Living people
American people of Hungarian-Romanian descent
21st-century American physicists
Romanian physicists
Members of the Hungarian Academy of Sciences
Complex systems scientists
Northeastern University faculty
University of Notre Dame faculty
Boston University alumni
University of Bucharest alumni
Romanian people of Hungarian descent
People from Harghita County
Members of Academia Europaea
Probability theorists
Harvard Medical School faculty
Fellows of the American Physical Society
Network scientists
Statistical physicists